Helmes AS is an international software consultancy company headquartered in Tallinn. The company has a branch in Minsk, Belarus and offices in other European countries.

About 
Helmes is best known for business software and its range of services are used around the world by corporations such as 2Park Technologies, Telia, Solera Inc, Kühne+Nagel, DNB, OECD and International Energy Agency.

Helmes has also developed many government provided e-services, for instance the elections info system and the e-prescription system, the latter being the recipient of various quality and innovation awards.

History 
Helmes was established in 1991 and to date the company employs a work force of over 560 people. In 2016, Hermes earned 22 million euro in revenue. The founder and current CEO is Jaan Pillesaar (born 1967), who is also CEO of the Estonia Service Industry Association.

Spin-offs 
Successful spin-offs of Helmes include the international IT purchasing company MarkIT Holding AS, operating in 29 countries with a revenue of 80 million euros in 2016 and the mobile parking company NowInnovations.

References 

Software companies established in 1991
Companies of Estonia